Brovnichi is a rural locality (a selo) in Klimovsky District, Bryansk Oblast, Russia. The population was 66 as of 2010. There are 3 streets.

Geography 
Brovnichi is located 21 km southeast of Klimovo (the district's administrative centre) by road. Sushany is the nearest rural locality.

References 

Rural localities in Klimovsky District